Barkly may refer to :

Places

Australia

Northern Territory 
 Barkly Tableland, one of the five regions in the Northern Territory 
 Barkly Highway, a national highway of both Queensland and Northern Territory 
 Electoral division of Barkly, a rural electorate
 Barkly Region, a local government area

Queensland 

 Barkly, Queensland, an outback locality within the City of Mount Isa

Victoria 
 Barkly, Victoria, a town in the Pyrenees Shire

South Africa
 Barkly East, a South Africa town
 Barkly West, Northern Cape, a town in South Africa

Other 
 Henry Barkly (1815–1898), a British politician and colonial governor
 Anne Maria Barkly (1837-1892) botanist and governor's 2nd wife
 West Barkly languages, a small language family

See also
Barkley (disambiguation)